O'Neale may refer to:

Dion O'Neale, New Zealand applied mathematician
Lila Morris O'Neale (1886–1948), American anthropologist and historian of textiles
Rachid O'Neale (born 1991), Barbadian cricketer
Royce O'Neale (born 1993), American professional basketball player
Sarah O'Neale (née Thompson), fictional character from the Australian Channel Seven soap opera Home and Away
Tug O'Neale, fictional character from the Australian Channel Seven soap opera Home and Away
Walter O'Neale, D.D., Irish Anglican priest in the seventeenth to eighteenth century
Benjamin O'Neale Stratford, 4th Earl of Aldborough (1746–1833), Irish peer and politician
Margaret O'Neale Eaton (1799–1879), wife of John Henry Eaton, United States Senator and United States Secretary of War

See also
O'Neale v. Thornton, 10 U.S. (6 Cranch) 53 (1810), a ruling by the Supreme Court of the United States
O'Neal
O'Neill
Neale (disambiguation)